Archduchess Maria Elisabeth of Austria may refer to:

 Archduchess Maria Elisabeth of Austria (governor) (1680–1741)
 Archduchess Maria Elisabeth of Austria (1737–1740)
 Archduchess Maria Elisabeth of Austria (1743–1808)